"How Sweet It Is (To Be Loved by You)" is a song recorded by American soul singer Marvin Gaye from his fifth studio album  of the same name (1965). It was written in 1964 by the Motown songwriting team of Holland–Dozier–Holland, and produced by Brian Holland and Lamont Dozier.  The song title was inspired by one of the actor and comedian Jackie Gleason's signature phrases, "How Sweet It Is!"

Marvin Gaye version
Produced by Brian Holland and Lamont Dozier, the song was released as a single in September 1964. It peaked at number six on the US Billboard Hot 100 chart in January 1965 and at number three on US Billboard's R&B Singles chart.  Up to that point, it was Gaye's most successful single with record sales exceeding 900,000 copies. The song's personnel includes Marvin Gaye on lead vocals; The Andantes on background vocals; and The Funk Brothers on various instruments, including piano and percussion. Gaye also released a German-language version of the song entitled "Wie Schön Das Ist".

Cash Box described it as "a medium-paced, rollicking chorus-backed ode about a fella who's on top of the world since he met up with Miss Right."  AllMusic critic Jason Ankeny described the song as a "radiant pop confection," noting that it was unusual for Gaye in being a "straightforward love song" that doesn't reflect Gaye's usual demons. Ankeny commented on the soulfulness of the song, and particularly noted the piano riff.

Gaye's recording has subsequently been released on many greatest hits albums.

Personnel
 Marvin Gaye – lead vocals
 The Andantes – backing vocals
 The Funk Brothers – instrumental backing

Chart history

Weekly charts

Year-end charts

James Taylor version

James Taylor released his version of "How Sweet It Is (To Be Loved by You)" as the lead single from his album Gorilla (1975).  Taylor's 1975 single has been the most successful remake of the song to date, hitting number one on the Easy Listening chart and number five on the US Billboard Hot 100 chart. In addition to James Taylor on lead vocals and guitar, other personnel include his then-wife Carly Simon on harmony vocals, Danny Kortchmar on guitar, David Sanborn on saxophone, Clarence McDonald on piano, Fender Rhodes electric piano and possibly ARP String Ensemble, Lee Sklar on bass guitar and both Jim Keltner and Russ Kunkel on drums with Kunkel doubling on tambourine.  Author Ian Halperin believes that the song was included on Gorilla as a tribute to Simon, who was then his wife.  It was produced by Lenny Waronker and Russ Titelman.  After his success with "How Sweet It Is (To Be Loved by You)," Taylor continued to record R&B hits applying his soft rock approach.

Rolling Stone critic Bud Scoppa described Taylor's version as "a relaxed rendition" and considered it to be Taylor's way of acknowledging Gaye as a source of inspiration for Taylor's romantic point of view at the time.  Music critic Robert Christgau regarded Taylor's version as a "desecration of Marvin Gaye."  Taylor biographer Timothy White described it as "music for the park on Sunday."  Cash Box said that the "orchestration is tastefully executed" and that "vocally Taylor puts an oh so mellow coating to this surefire winner."

Taylor's version has been released on many live and compilation albums.  These include the compilation albums Greatest Hits (1976), Classic Songs (1990), The Best of James Taylor (2003) and The Essential James Taylor (2013).  Live versions have been included on Live and Live at the Beacon Theater.

Personnel
Source:
James Taylor - vocals, acoustic guitar
Danny Kortchmar - electric guitar
Leland Sklar - bass
Jim Keltner - drums
Russ Kunkel - drums, tambourine
Clarence McDonald - piano, Fender Rhodes
David Sanborn - saxophone
Carly Simon - vocals

Chart history

Weekly charts

Year-end charts

Other versions
In 1966, Junior Walker & the All Stars released the song as a single, which reached number 3 on the R&B Singles chart and No. 18 on the Billboard Hot 100 chart. According to Jason Ankeny of AllMusic, this version makes up in grit what it lacks in Gaye's grace, increasing the "celebratory" feel of the song. Ankeny described the version as "a rollicking floor-shaker fueled by his smoldering saxophone." The drums are played by James Graves (1941-1967).  The song was also recorded by Michael Bublé & featured regularly in Jerry Garcia Band sets.
There is also a fine a cappella arrangement of the song for four voices by Kirby Shaw

References

External links
 
 

1964 singles
1965 singles
1975 singles
Marvin Gaye songs
James Taylor songs
Tamla Records singles
Pop ballads
RPM Top Singles number-one singles
Songs written by Holland–Dozier–Holland
Junior Walker songs
1964 songs
Song recordings produced by Lamont Dozier
Song recordings produced by Brian Holland
Song recordings produced by Lenny Waronker
Song recordings produced by Russ Titelman
Warner Records singles